Szumski (feminine Szumska) is a Polish surname. Notable people with the surname include:

 Jakub Szumski (born 1992), Polish footballer
 Krzysztof Szumski (born 1944), Polish diplomat
 Michał Szumski (born 1976), Polish ice dancer

Polish-language surnames